Varuni is the name of multiple goddesses associated with the Hindu god Varuna — his wife (also known as Varunani), his daughter (the goddess of wine), and the personification of his shakti (A matrika or mother goddess). Sometimes, these goddesses are identified as one deity. In this context, she is the goddess of wine, who emerged during the Samudra Manthana (churning of the ocean) and chose Varuna as her consort. The term Varuni also refers to an alcoholic drink.

Varuna's wife 
The first Varuni is also known as Varunani  and Jaldevi. She is one of the two chief consorts of Varuna, the other being goddess Gauri. In some texts, Gauri is just another name for Varunani. She is commonly depicted alongside her husband.

Varuna's daughter 
The second goddess with the name Varuni is the daughter of Varuna. She is regarded as the goddess of wine. According to the Puranas, when the Devas and Asuras were churning the ocean, Varuni came out of it and had a pot of alcohol in her hands. 

According to the Bhagavata Purana, Varuni was taken by Asura, but Ramayana narrates that Varuni chose to live with the Devas.

Matrika 
The third goddess is a Matrika found in Matsya Purana. She is the manifestation of the first Varuni and the divine energy of Varuna. As per the story, she was created to drink the blood of a demon Andhaka. She is also one of the 64 yogini(s).

References

Encyclopedia for Epics of Ancient India, accessed 13 May 2006

External links
A Wisdom Archive on Varuni

Hindu goddesses
Rigvedic deities
Deities of wine and beer